Monochroa gracilella is a moth of the family Gelechiidae. It was described by Pierre Chrétien in 1908. It is found in Algeria.

The wingspan is 9–10.5 mm. The forewings are white with brown or black scales. The hindwings are whitish.

References

Moths described in 1908
Monochroa